El Monte is a Chilean city and commune in Talagante Province, Santiago Metropolitan Region. As of 2007, it had a population of 29,568.

Geography

Demographics
Of these, 22,284 (84.2%) lived in urban areas and 4,175 (15.8%) in rural areas. The population grew by 20.9% (4,577 persons) between the 1992 and 2002 censuses.

Administration
As a commune, El Monte is a third-level administrative division of Chile administered by a municipal council, headed by an alcalde who is directly elected every four years. The 2012-2016 alcalde is Francisco Gómez Ramírez (PS). The communal council has the following members:
 Juan Pablo Gómez Ramírez (PDC)
 Rossana Sanhueza Muñoz (IND)
 Mario Varela Montero (UDI)
 Guisela Rosales Reyes (IND)
 Andres Maass Reyes (RN)
 Rolando Ortega Valdivia (PDC)

Within the electoral divisions of Chile, El Monte is represented in the Chamber of Deputies by Denise Pascal (PS) and Gonzalo Uriarte (UDI) as part of the 31st electoral district, (together with Talagante, Peñaflor, Isla de Maipo, Melipilla, María Pinto, Curacaví, Alhué, San Pedro and Padre Hurtado). The commune is represented in the Senate by Guido Girardi Lavín (PPD) and Jovino Novoa Vásquez (UDI) as part of the 7th senatorial constituency (Santiago-West).

References

External links
  Municipality of El Monte

Communes of Chile
Populated places in Talagante Province